Megan Elizabeth Wright (née Metcalfe; born 27 January 1982) is a Canadian long-distance runner who specializes in the 5000 metres.  Metcalfe attended West Virginia University, where she won the 2005 NCAA outdoor title in the 5000m. She was born in Edmonton, Alberta. She was the NACAC Cross Country Champion in 2006.

Achievements

Personal bests
1500 metres - 4:10.28 min (2010) 
Mile run 4:39.12 min (2007), indoor - 4:31.91 min (2006)
3000 metres - 8:44.29 min (2010), indoor - 8:48.56 min (2008)
5000 metres - 15:11.23 min (2008), indoor - 15:25.15 (2011)
10000 metres - 32:40.40 min (2011)

References

External links

Official website for Megan Metcalfe 

1982 births
Living people
Canadian female long-distance runners
Athletes (track and field) at the 2007 Pan American Games
Athletes (track and field) at the 2008 Summer Olympics
Olympic track and field athletes of Canada
Pan American Games gold medalists for Canada
Pan American Games medalists in athletics (track and field)
Athletes from Edmonton
Competitors at the 2005 Summer Universiade
Medalists at the 2007 Pan American Games